Alexander Vasilyevich Fomin ( born May 25, 1959) is the Russian Deputy Minister of Defence.

Biography
Alexander Fomin was born on May 25, 1959, in Leninogorsk. He attended the Military Institute of the Red Banner of the Ministry of Defence (Now the Military University of the Russian Defence Ministry), graduating in 1984.

Fomin was promoted to Deputy Minister of Defence of the Russian Federation in 2017.

References

1959 births
Living people
Russian colonel generals
Recipients of the Order "For Merit to the Fatherland", 3rd class
Recipients of the Order "For Merit to the Fatherland", 4th class
Recipients of the Order of Honour (Russia)
People from Leninogorsk, Russia
Recipients of the Medal of the Order "For Merit to the Fatherland" II class
Deputy Defence Ministers of Russia